Etrek (formerly Gyzyletrek, Bayat-Khadzhi , Kyzyl-Atrek)  is a city and administrative center of Etrek District in Balkan Province, Turkmenistan. It is located on the Atrek River bordering on Iran.  The city's and district's name was changed to Etrek in December 1999 by Parliamentary Resolution HM-63.

Etymology
Atanyyazow postulates that the name "Etrek" comes from the Turkic word atrau, which refers to the shore of a body of water. The name was first encountered in the 13th century, in the works of Hamdallah Qazvi. Atanyyazow further makes clear that the prefix gyzyl- was added during the Soviet period as a reference to the revolutionary color "red". This municipality was known as Baýat-Hajy until 1928. Atanyyazow nods to local elders who say the name honored an early resident who completed the pilgrimage to Mecca, but notes that a local tribe is also named Baýat.

Overview
Nearby towns and villages include Agach-Arvat (4.8 km), Torshakli, Iran (6.3 km), Yasydepe (15.6 km), and Yarymtyk (19.4 km). There is no air service to Etrek, although there is an airport, Kizyl Atrek Airport, just to the south.

Etrek is the site of a barracks of the State Border Service of Turkmenistan, and is the location of a satellite office of the State Migration Service.  The city and its district are included in the list of frontier areas of Turkmenistan subject to border service control.

Climate
Etrek has a desert climate (Köppen climate classification BWk), with cool winters and hot summers. Rainfall is generally light and erratic, and is heavier in winter than in summer.

References

External links
 "Gyzyletrek" at geonames.org

See also 
List of cities, towns and villages in Turkmenistan

Populated places in Balkan Region